14 rating refers to a type of age-based content rating that applies to media entertainment, such as films, television shows and computer games. The following articles document the rating across a range of countries and mediums:

Classification organizations
 Brazilian advisory rating system (14)
 Canadian motion picture rating system (14A)
Canadian Home Video Rating System
Manitoba Film Classification Board
Maritime Film Classification Board
British Columbia Film Classification Office
Saskatchewan Film and Video Classification Board
Ontario Film Review Board
 TV Parental Guidelines (TV-14)
 Common Sense Media (14+)

Systems
 Motion picture content rating system, a range of classification systems for films that commonly use the age 14 as part of its regulatory criteria
 Television content rating system, a range of classification systems for television broadcasts that commonly use the age 14 as part of its regulatory criteria
 Video game content rating system, a range of classification systems for video games that commonly use the age 14 as part of its regulatory criteria
 Mobile software content rating system, a range of classification systems for mobile software that commonly use the age 14 as part of its regulatory criteria